The integral associations of the Indian National Army's history with that of the war in South East Asia, especially the Japanese occupation of South East Asian countries, the renunciations of the oath to the King, as well as British war-time propaganda and later allegations of torture by INA soldiers have inspired a number of controversies. Principal among these is British intelligence propaganda during the war which alleged torture at a massive scale of British Indian Army and Allied prisoners of war by the INA troops in collaboration with the Japanese.

A strongly opposed view has emerged after the war, especially within India, based on the motivations of the troops who formed the INA, where a predominant view was held, and still holds, of the INA as patriots and revolutionaries. Outside India it is not widely known, and the accounts and views on the INA, especially among the Allied servicemen who served in Burma, are diametrically opposite. However, almost no account of the Indian independence movement ignores the INA.

Other controversies have risen on the contributions of the INA to India's independence, the treatment of INA troops in Independent India, as well as the conditions of expatriate Indians who joined the INA.

Axis collaboration

Breaking Oath
Different historians have cited other reasons for the INA's recruits volunteering to serve with the Japanese enemy. These included both the ideal of wanting to fight for India's independence, the inevitable desire not to be interned in the POW camp, as well as ambition. Some cite the destruction and devaluation of the Raj's prestige and authority in the Malayan debacle and the humiliating surrender at Singapore that first shook the Sepoys' loyalty to the Raj. In addition, a number of authors have cited the disparity in the service conditions (including scopes of progression in the army) and treatment of white and Indian troops within the army as another reason for ill-feelings within the Indian troops.

Further reason cited by Both Fay and Lebra and other authors indicate monetary and situational scopes, as well as the resentment at the abandonment of the Indian troops at Singapore by their White comrades and the officers. Controversy exists as to what was actually said by Col J.C. Hunt in the first of the three speeches during the surrender ceremony for the Indian troops at Farrer Park on 17 February 1942. Fay writes in 1993 that a number of the troops gathered at the park remembers Hunt as having told the troops that they now belonged to the Japanese army and should obey their orders while Hunt only remembers having said that they were all Prisoners of War of the Japanese Nevertheless, Fay also points out that the fact that they were all POWs was already self-evident, and the fact that they were addressed separately implies some significance. A number of INA veterans present at the ceremony have said that, for the Indian troops, this also fed a feeling of devaluation (handed over like cattle, as Shah Nawaz Khan later put it), abandonment and of dishonour on part of the British high command that they perceived to have served loyalty.

In the days and years to come, a number of INA men cited this act of abandonment a major reason to join the first INA. Others, especially the officer corps including the Indian Commissioned Officers (ICOs) and Viceroy's Commissioned Officers (VCOs) have said that they initially joined the first INA to prevent any possible ill-treatment of their subordinate Indian soldiers. When Singapore fell, eyewitness reports suggested "rows of Indian POWs were shot" by the Japanese. However, all authors agree that Subhas Chandra Bose's charismatic leadership and persona was probably also amongst the most significant factors that drew the recruits of the second INA and was key in transforming it into a cohesive fighting force.
A large number of Indian soldiers did not join the army and remained as PoWs. Many were sent to work in the Death Railway and suffered hardships under Japanese internment, and nearly eleven thousand died. Many of these soldiers, cited the oath of alleigance they had taken to the King as a reason not to join a Japanese-supported organisation, and regarded the recruits of the INA as being traitors. Commanders in the British-Indian Army like Wavell later highlighted the hardships this group of soldiers suffered, contrasting them with the troops of the INA.

Collaboration
During the war, the associations of the INA with the Japanese, and circulating stories of it being a small force of turncoats, of participations in outrages by Japanese forces and other stories meant that a number of Congress leaders viewed what it knew about the INA as a traitor army. In addition, a number of Congress Leaders, including Gandhi, announced the Japanese as unwelcome. Other political forces, including the Indian Communist Party and its members viewed the INA as fascist-collaborators, and was instrumental in helping the British Indian police and security forces track down INA agents landed in India by submarine or Parachute during the war. Amongst the allied troops who fought in South-east Asia the predominant opinion of the INA, especially in the accounts of the war in the popular accounts of British and Australian servicemen of the war in Burma, is of a contemptuous auxiliary force that was a totally ineffective fighting force and composed of cowards and brutes who sought opportunities to desert.

The army intelligence service in India, when it became aware of the establishment and existence of the INA, was also faced with the possibilities of the sepoys of the Eastern Army (as the 14th Army was called then) deserting. It was also during this time that the intelligence started coming in possession of accounts of torture and ill-treatment meted out to Allied troops and PoWs by the Japanese forces in Burma. During the war, the psychological warfare section of the India Command under Lt Colonel Hunt, known as GSI(q), to propaganda against the INA. and British commander and officers of the 14th Army were instructed to allude to the existence of the INA to the frontline Indian troops. These were also to include references to the army as an auxiliary force to the Japanese forces, as well as that they were collaborators and traitors. After the war, Allied PoWs, as well as Indian PoWs who did not join the INA, described bitter memories of labour camps and ill-treatment in the hands of Japanese forces. 
In addition, the war time intelligence work and propaganda had described the INA to the media, incorrectly, as a small force of deserters from among a large majority of Indian PoWs who remained loyal to the Raj and refused to join. In addition, the propaganda work also associated the INA with Japanese atrocities on allied PoWs and local populace. These allegations were not corrected or withdrawn at the end of the war.

Allegations of torture
Allegations of torture by the INA were also made during the war. Fay, however, notes that these allegations were not borne out by the number of men charged with torture at the Red Fort trials, nor by the charges against them. In the first INA trials, Fay notes the three men were charged with Murder and abetment to murder of troops of the INA itself who had attempted to desert, and argues that this had been in an open process based on the INA's own laws, drawn from the Indian Army Act, 1911, noting the court found the three men not guilty. However, Fay also describes the some of later ones of the ten or so trials, most prominently that of Burhan-ud-Din of Chitral and others, where the allegations of torture in Fay's opinion were justified. Nevertheless, Fay argues that these made up a few instances and by no means match up to the large scale torture alleged and concludes these to be war-time intelligence manoeuvres of the Jiffs campaign.

Some have also made allegations of complicity in the Selarang Barracks Incident at Singapore in 1942, where INA guards are alleged to have shot four Australian PoWs who had attempted to escape from Changi Prison.

Independent India

Indian independence
It has been argued by a number of historians, contemporary and modern, that the preparations for British withdrawal from India had already begun before World War II started, and the INA or the movements arising out of it achieved nothing. The pro-Bose camp has however argued that although the will to relinquish the Raj may have existed already, but the events of the Red Fort trials, the Bombay mutiny and destabilisation within the armed forces were a principal reason for the hasty end to the Raj even in the face of dismal political scene. The INA has also been criticized since a military success by the INA and its allies, would have probably led to bondage for India and the rest of South East Asia to Japan.

Within India, the story of the Army was seen at the time, and still seen, both as fascinating story as well as a turning-point in the movement for Independence. After the ban on the INA was lifted on 10 May, it was seen as the first "national" force not decreed by caste and religion. As Sumit Sarkar puts it, its biggest impact was on the patriotic imagination of an army fighting for the country's independence, led by a Bengalee- the least "Martial" of India's "races" in traditional British stereotype. Reports and tales on the INA emerged in the national and vernacular press, after the ban on reporting the INA was lifted in April 1945, along with this the coverage of the Red Fort trials engendered much public agitations and support for the troops and quickly became a major driving force in the closing days of the Independence Movement. The INA's war cries of "Chalo Delhi" (on to Delhi) and most of all "Jai Hind" were among the slogans of independence movement, and of protesters demanding their release.

INA in modern Indian history
A further controversy exists, especially within India, with regards to the attitude and treatment towards the INA by the post-1947 Governments of India as well as the omission of the events of September 1945-46 from the historical records of the independence movement.

Nehru, in 1948, refused to readmit the men of the INA to the Indian Army after independence. He cited the break in the service of the ex-INA men, as well as the effects on the Indian Army of taking ex-INA troops into their ranks. However, it has been noted that as late as 1948, considerable pro-INA sentiments existed in the army as well as public psyche, attracting strong dissatisfactions from members of Nehru's cabinet. Defence Minister Sardar Baldev Singh is on record as having commented on the need to strengthen the morale of the Indian army 
A history of the army and of Azad Hind, written by Indian historian Pratul Chandra Gupta in 1950s at the request of the Indian Government, was subsequently classified and not released until 2006.

Freedom fighters pension
Also, although Nehru promised pensions, the men of the INA were not eligible for the Freedom Fighters Pension till 1972. A number of people, notably ex-members of the INA and sympathetic groups have accused the Nehru, Mountbatten, and subsequently successive Congress governments, of largely ignoring and not-recognising the role of the INA, as well as the events surrounding it between 1945–46, in the history of the Independence movement. These have been compounded by a number of conspiracy-theories and news reports in the past on agreements between the Indian political leadership to hand over its leader Subhas Chandra Bose as a war criminal if he was found to be alive. Later historians have, however, argued that given the political aim and nature of the entire Azad Hind movement especially the Indian National Army, Nehru's decisions may have been to prevent politicisation of the army and assert civilian authority over the military.

Further criticisms have been made in recent years for the general hardships and apathy surrounding the conditions of ex-INA troops including, for example, the circumstances surrounding the death and funeral of Ram Singh Thakur, the composer of Qadam Qadam Badhaye Ja.

Expatriate stateless veterans
Also, criticisms have been made for the lack of recognition afforded to the expatriate Indians, notably Burmese Indians, who joined the INA and were not repatriated to India at the end of the war. Most are not recognised as Indian citizens, and not recognised as citizens in their adopted countries, effectively being stateless people.

Azad Hind treasures
Further controversy relates to the fate of the Azad Hind fortune. Bose is said to have been travelling with it during his last known journey. The treasure, a considerable amount of gold ornaments and gems, is said to have been recovered from Bose's belongings following the fatal plane crash in Formosa that reportedly killed him. Despite repeated warnings from Indian diplomats in Tokyo, Nehru is said to have disregarded allegations that men previously associated with Azad Hind misappropriated the funds for personal benefit. Some of these are said to have travelled to Japan repeatedly with the approval of Nehru government and were later given government roles implementing Nehru's political and economic agenda. A very small portion of the alleged treasure was repatriated to India in 1950s.

References

Bibliography
 

 
 

 

To the Kwai and Back, War Drawings 1939-1945 by Ronald Searle.

External links
"Foreign News: Patriots, Not Traitors". Time. 14 January 1946.
Bengal Tiger and British Lion: An Account of the Bengal Famine of 1943. By Richard Stevenson.

Subhas Chandra Bose
Indian National Army
Military of British India
Controversies in India